Hrastov may refer to:

Hrastovec, Velenje
Hrastovec, Zavrč
Hrastovec pod Bočem
Hrastovec v Slovenskih Goricah